The Dutch Eerste Divisie in the 1987–88 season was contested by 19 teams. RKC Waalwijk won the championship.

New entrants
Relegated from the 1986–87 Eredivisie
 Excelsior
 Go Ahead Eagles
 SC Veendam

League standings

Promotion competition
In the promotion competition, four period winners (the best teams during each of the four quarters of the regular competition) played for promotion to the eredivisie.

See also
 1987–88 Eredivisie
 1987–88 KNVB Cup

References
Netherlands - List of final tables (RSSSF)

Eerste Divisie seasons
2
Neth